The 2019 ITTF Pan-America Cup was a table tennis competition that took place from 1–3 February in Guaynabo, Puerto Rico, organised under the authority of the International Table Tennis Federation (ITTF).

Men's singles and women's singles events were held. Brazil's Hugo Calderano retained the men's singles title he won for the first time in 2018, while Adriana Díaz of Puerto Rico won the women's singles title for the first time. The winners and runners-up in each event qualified automatically for the 2019 Men's and Women's World Cups.

Medalists

Men's singles

Seeding

Players were seeded according to the February 2019 ITTF World Ranking.

Group stage

The preliminary group stage took place on 1 February. The winner of each group advanced to the main draw.

Main draw

The main draw took place from 2–3 February.

Women's singles

Seeding

Players were seeded according to the February 2019 ITTF World Ranking.

Group stage

The preliminary group stage took place on 1 February. The winner of each group advanced to the main draw.

Main draw

The main draw takes place from 2–3 February.

See also

2019 Pan American Table Tennis Championships
2019 ITTF-ATTU Asian Cup
2019 Europe Top 16 Cup
2019 ITTF-Oceania Cup

References

External links

Tournament page on ITTF website

Pan American Table Tennis Cup
Pan-America Cup
ITTF Pan-America Cup
ITTF Pan-America Cup
ITTF Pan-America Cup
ITTF Pan-America Cup